Eduardo Angulo can refer to:

 Eduardo Angulo (footballer) (born 1953), Bolivian footballer
 Eduardo Angulo (writer) (born 1958), Spanish writer and professor